A crutch is a mobility aid that transfers weight from the legs to the upper body.

Crutch may also refer to:

 Crutch (film), a 2004 American film directed by Rob Moretti
 Aletheian, formerly Crutch, an American metal band
 Crutch, Worcestershire, a former extra-parochial place in Halfshire, a medieval hundred of Worcestershire, UK
 The Crutch, a col on a ridge on the shore of Cumberland West Bay, South Georgia
 Crutch, in smoking, a type of mouthpiece for a roach
 Crutch, an adjustable handrest on a bassoon
 "Crutch", a 2000 song by Matchbox Twenty from Mad Season

See also
 Crutching, in sheep husbandry, a hygienic shearing practice